The sport of football in the country of Rwanda is run by the Rwandese Association Football Federation. The association administers the national football team, as well as the Rwandan Premier League. Football is the most popular sport in Rwanda.

National team
The Rwanda national team has traditionally been among the weaker sides in African football. They have attempted to qualify for the Africa Cup of Nations on a number of occasions but managed this only once, in 2004. Although eliminated in the first round Rwanda did manage to defeat former champions Congo DR and draw with Guinea.

They also participate in the CECAFA Cup, a regional tournament involving east and central African national teams only. Rwanda's sole international success came in this competition when the country's 'B' team defeated Kenya in the final. Rwanda's full national team, which also took part in the competition, actually finished third with the second string winning.

As of December 2014, the Rwandan national team had attained its historic record ranking on FIFA rankings that were released on Thursday, Dec 18, 2014. Rwanda was ranked 68th globally, 19th in Africa, and 1st in East Africa. The Amavubi are the biggest mover on the world rankings, 22 places from 90th position in November 2014 following a goalless draw in Marrakesh versus the Morocco national team.

Club football
The Rwandan Premier League is the country's top competition, with APR FC its most successful club. The Rwandan Cup is the main knock-out competition, with Rayon Sports FC the leading side in the cup. On the international stage Rwandan sides have enjoyed some success in the regional Kagame Inter-Club Cup, with Rayon Sport taking the title in 1998, APR FC winning in 2005 and 2007 and ATRACO FC successful in 2009.

As of 2013 they are the only country in East Africa to have an established women's football league, the Rwanda Women's Football League.

Football stadiums in Rwanda

References